The House of the Seven Chimneys (Spanish: Casa de las Siete Chimeneas) is a building located in Madrid, Spain. It was constructed in the sixteenth century and is named after its chimneys.  In the seventeenth century it was an ambassadorial residence, being the home of Sir Richard Fanshawe and his family.

It is protected by a heritage listing, having been declared Bien de Interés Cultural in 1995.

References 

Buildings and structures in Justicia neighborhood, Madrid
Bien de Interés Cultural landmarks in Madrid
Baroque palaces
Palaces in Madrid
16th-century architecture in Spain